Australocamelus is an extinct monospecific genus of camelid, endemic to North America.

References

Prehistoric camelids
Prehistoric even-toed ungulate genera
Miocene even-toed ungulates
Prehistoric mammals of North America
Fossil taxa described in 1969